The following is a list of principals of Royal Holloway, University of London, including its predecessor institutions, Royal Holloway College and Bedford College, London.

List of principals

Principals of Royal Holloway College
 Matilda Ellen Bishop (1887–1897)
 Emily Penrose (1898–1907)
 Ellen Charlotte Higgins (1907–1935)
 Janet Ruth Bacon (1935–1944)
 Fanny Street, acting principal (1944–1945)
 Edith Clara Batho (1945–1962)
 Marjorie Williamson (1962–1973)
 Lionel Harry Butler (1973–1981)
 Roy Miller (1982–1985)

Principals of Bedford College
 Emily Penrose (1893–1898)
 Ethel Hurlbatt (1898–1906)
 Margaret Tuke (1907–1929)
 Geraldine Emma May Jebb (1930–1951)
 Norah Lillian Penston (1951–1964)
 Elizabeth Millicent Chilver (1964–1971)
 John Nicholson Black (1971–1981)
 Dorothy Wedderburn (1981–1985)

Principals of Royal Holloway and Bedford New College
 Dorothy Wedderburn (1985–1990) 
 Norman Gowar (1990–2000)
 Drummond Bone (2000–2002)
 Stephen Hill (2002–2009)
 Paul Layzell (2010–2022)
 Julie Sanders (2022–present)

See also
 List of Royal Holloway, University of London people

References

Royal Holloway, University of London
Royal Holloway
London education-related lists